Macromolecular Rapid Communications is a biweekly peer-reviewed scientific journal covering  polymer science. It publishes Communications, Feature Articles and Reviews on general polymer science, from chemistry and physics of polymers to polymers in materials science and life sciences.

History
The journal was founded in 1979 as a supplement to the first journal in the field of polymer science, the Journal für Makromolekulare Chemie (Journal for Macromolecular Chemistry) as a forum for the rapid publication of the newest and most exciting developments in the field of polymer science. According to the Journal Citation Reports, the journal has a 2020 impact factor of 5.734. The editorial office is in Weinheim, Germany.

See also
 Macromolecular Chemistry and Physics, 1947
 Macromolecular Theory and Simulations, 1992
 Macromolecular Materials and Engineering, 2000
 Macromolecular Bioscience, 2001
 Macromolecular Reaction Engineering, 2007

References

External links
 

Chemistry journals
Materials science journals
Publications established in 1979
Biweekly journals
Wiley (publisher) academic journals
English-language journals